= Borić (cemetery) =

Catholic cemetery in Bosnia and Herzegovina

Coordinates: 44°32′40″N 18°40′41″E

Borić is primarily a Catholic cemetery in Tuzla, Bosnia and Herzegovina. It also has a section where members of the Jewish community are interred.

== History ==
The beginnings of the cemetery date back to the time of Austro-Hungarian occupation of Bosnia and Herzegovina. A group of Tuzla residents foresaw the inevitable collapse of the Ottoman Empire and the imminent arrival of Austro-Hungary. They organized a petition, requesting European powers to let Austria come to Bosnia and bring order. This group included Catholics, Muslims, and Orthodox Christians. Another group, mainly Muslims, opposed this and organized a defense. They awaited Austro-Hungarian forces at Moluh, Kozlovac, Ravna Trešnja, and Mosnik. In the battle of 1878, they repelled the forces and forced them to retreat to Doboj after two days. Austro-Hungary suffered significant losses near Moluh, where they temporarily buried their dead. About twenty days later, reinforced Austro-Hungarian troops launched a new offensive and entrenched themselves near Tuzla. The next day, leading figures from all religions in Tuzla welcomed the Austro-Hungarian army. The army exhumed their fallen soldiers from temporary graves in Moluh and reburied them at Borić, making these soldiers the first to be buried in what is now the cemetery.

The Catholic cemetery at Borić is the final resting place for many generations of Croats from the Soli region, as well as other Catholic communities that settled in Tuzla during its cultural and industrial growth following the arrival of modern Western civilization with Austro-Hungary in the late 19th and early 20th centuries. Due to heavy rains and underground water movement, the Catholic cemetery in Tuzla is at risk of disappearing. Landslides, cracks, collapses, and tilted graves became a significant issue in 2014. Hundreds of graves were damaged. For decades, authorities did little to address the problem or secure the cemetery from further damage.

Although separated by municipalities and synagogues, the Jewish communities in Tuzla shared a common cemetery. It was established in 1900 at the Borić site and is one of only three Jewish cemeteries in Bosnia and Herzegovina. It is a highly valuable cultural and historical monument.
